Hawa may refer to:

Places
 Hawa, Idlib, Syria
 Hawa, Nepal
 Tel al-Hawa, Gaza, Palestine

Arts and entertainment
 Hawa (2003 film), a 2003 Hindi horror film starring Tabu
 Hawa (2022 Bangladeshi film), a 2022 Bangladeshi mystery-drama film and "E Hawa", a song from the film
 Hawa (2022 French film), a 2022 French drama film directed by Maïmouna Doucouré

Other
 Hawa (given name)
 Genipa americana, also known as the hawa tree
 Hannoversche Waggonfabrik, a German aircraft, train and automobile manufacturer

See also
 
 Hawaa, an Egyptian women's magazine
 Awa (given name)
 El-Hawa (disambiguation)